Robert the Strong (c. 830 – 866) was the father of two kings of West Francia: Odo (or Eudes) and Robert I of France. His family is named after him and called the Robertians. In 853, he was named missus dominicus by Charles the Bald, King of West Francia. Robert the Strong was the great-grandfather of Hugh Capet and thus the ancestor of all the Capetians.

Origins and rise to power
The parentage of Robert the Strong is obscure. While very little is known about the beginnings of the Robertian family, speculative proposals have been made. According to one proposal, Robert was a son of Robert III of Worms. Far more speculatively, mainly based on the use of the name Robert, or similar names, it has been proposed for example that his family had its origins in the Hesbaye region in present-day eastern Belgium, or perhaps descended from the family of Chrodegang of Metz. However, these proposals are unproven. 
 
According to the Worms proposal, during the reign of Louis the German in East Francia, the Robertian family emigrated from East Francia to West Francia. After their arrival in his realm Charles the Bald rewarded the family defecting from his enemy by assigning to Robert the lay abbacy of Marmoutier in 852. And in 853 he granted the position of missus dominicus in the provinces of Maine, Anjou, and Touraine to Robert, giving him de facto control of the ancient ducatus Cenomannicus, a large duchy centred on Le Mans and corresponding to the ancient realm of regnum Neustriae. Robert's rise came at the expense of the established family of the Rorigonids and was designed to curb their regional power and to defend Neustria from Viking and Breton raids.

Revolt

In 858 Robert joined a rebellion against Charles the Bald. With the Bretons under Salomon he led the Frankish nobles of Neustria and invited Louis the German to invade West Francia and receive their homage. The revolt had been sparked by a marriage alliance between Charles and Erispoe, King of Brittany, and by the investment of Charles' son, Louis the Stammerer, with the regnum Neustriae, all which significantly curtailed the powers of both Salomon and Robert. Charles had given Robert the counties of Autun and Nevers in Burgundy; and in 856 Robert had defended Autun from Louis the German. But following Erispoe's assassination in November 857, he and Salomon rebelled against Charles. 

Robert's Neustrians chased Louis the Stammerer from Le Mans in 858. Later that year, Louis the German reached Orléans and received delegations from the Breton and Neustrian leaders, as well as from Pepin II of Aquitaine. In 861, Charles made peace with Robert and appointed him Count of Anjou. Thereafter, Robert successfully defended the northern coast against a Viking invasion. 

In 862 Charles granted Louis the Stammerer, his son, the lay abbacy of Saint Martin of Tours—a worthy benefice but small in comparison with the kingdom he had received in 856, and lost in 858. The young Louis rebelled and, befriended by Salomon who supplied him with troops, mounted war against Robert. 

In 862 two Viking fleets converged on Brittany; one had recently been forced out of the Seine by Charles the Bald, the other was returning from a Mediterranean expedition. Salomon hired the Mediterranean fleet to ravage the Loire valley in Nuestria. Robert captured twelve of their ships, killing all on board save a few who fled. He then hired the former Seine Vikings to attack Salomon's realm for 6,000 pounds silver. 

Robert's apparent purpose was to prevent the Vikings from serving Salomon. He presumably collected a large amount in taxes for a (non-tributary) Danegeld to pay for keeping the Vikings out of Neustria. But peace between the Franks and the Vikings did not last long: in 863 Salomon made his peace, but the Vikings, now deprived of enemy lands to loot, proceeded to ravage Neustria. Charles now made Robert Lay abbot of the influential abbey St. Martin at Tours.

Robert warred with Pepin II in his later years. In 863 he again defended Autun from Louis the German; he campaigned in Neustria in 865 and again in 866, shortly before his death, dealing with Bretons and Vikings ravaging the environs of Le Mans.

Death and legacy 

On 2 July 866, Robert was killed at the Battle of Brissarthe while defending Francia against a joint Breton-Viking raiding party led by Salomon, King of Brittany and the Viking chieftain Hastein. During the battle the Viking commander was entrapped in a nearby church. Robert removed his armour to start to besiege the church; the Vikings then launched a surprise attack and Robert died in the subsequent melee. He left behind a nine-year-old son, Odo (who would later be King of France), as his heir. His heroic successes against the Vikings led to his characterization as "a second Maccabaeus" in the Annales Fuldenses.

Family
Robert married Adelaide of Tours, daughter of Hugh of Tours. They had:
 Odo of France (c.857–898), King of West Francia 
 Robert I of France (c.866–923), King of West Francia.

Notes

References

Inline citations

General references
Smith, Julia M. H. Province and Empire: Brittany and the Carolingians. Cambridge University Press: 1992. 
Hummer, Hans J. Politics and Power in Early Medieval Europe: Alsace and the Frankish Realm 600 – 1000. Cambridge University Press: 2005.

External links
Baldwin, Stewart (26 July 2008). "Robert 'le Fort' (Rotbertus Fortis, Robert 'the Strong')". Henry Project.

830s births
866 deaths
Year of birth uncertain

Robertians
Counts of Orléans
Counts of Anjou
Dukes of Maine
Nobility of the Carolingian Empire